Chakravarthy, Chakravarthi, Chakravarti or Chakravarty may refer to:

Films
Chakravarthy (1977 film), Indian Tamil film
Chakravarthy (1987 film), Indian Telugu film
Chakravarthy (1991 film), Indian Malayalam film
Chakravarthy (1995 film), Indian Tamil film
Chakravarthy (2017 film), Indian Kannada film

People
 Balli Kalyan Chakravarthy (born 1984), Indian politician
 C. Rajagopalachari (1878–1972), Indian lawyer, Independence activist, politician, writer
 K. Chakravarthy (1936–2002), Telugu film score composer

Other
 Chakravarti (Sanskrit term), a universal king in Indian and Asian literature

See also
 
 Chakravarti (disambiguation)
 Chakraborty (name)

Hindu given names
Indian given names
Telugu names
Telugu given names